Depressive personality disorder (also known as melancholic personality disorder) is a psychiatric diagnosis that denotes a personality disorder with depressive features.

Originally included in the American Psychiatric Association's DSM-II, depressive personality disorder was removed from the DSM-III and DSM-III-R. The latest description of depressive personality disorder is described in Appendix B in the DSM-IV-TR. Although no longer listed as a personality disorder in the DSM-5, the diagnosis of subclinical Other Specified Personality Disorder and Unspecified Personality Disorder can be used to classify an equivalent of depressive personality disorder. In the DSM-5, it has been reconsidered for reinstatement as a diagnosis in an alternative approach to personality disorders in the form of "general criteria for personality disorder" which primarily assesses "impairments in personality functioning".

While depressive personality disorder shares some similarities with mood disorders such as dysthymia, it also shares many similarities with other personality disorders including avoidant personality disorder. Some researchers argue that depressive personality disorder is sufficiently distinct from these other conditions so as to warrant a separate diagnosis.

Characteristics
The DSM-IV defines depressive personality disorder as "a pervasive pattern of depressive cognitions and behaviors beginning by early adulthood and occurring in a variety of contexts." Depressive personality disorder occurs before, during, and after major depressive episodes, making it a distinct diagnosis not included in the definition of either major depressive episodes or dysthymic disorder. Specifically, five or more of the following must be present most days for at least two years in order for a diagnosis of depressive personality disorder to be made:
Usual mood is dominated by dejection, gloominess, cheerlessness, joylessness and unhappiness
Self-concept centres on beliefs of inadequacy, worthlessness and low self-esteem
Is critical, blaming and derogatory towards the self
Is brooding and given to worry
Is negativistic, critical and judgmental toward others
Is pessimistic
Is prone to feeling guilty or remorseful

Studies in 2000-2002 have found more of a correlation between depressive personality disorder and dysthymia than a comparable group of people without depressive personality disorder.

Millon’s subtypes
Theodore Millon identified five subtypes of depression. Any individual depressive may exhibit none, or one or more of the following:

Not all patients with a depressive disorder fall into a subtype. These subtypes are multidimensional in that patients usually experience multiple subtypes, instead of being limited to fitting into one subtype category. Currently, this set of subtypes is associated with melancholic personality disorders. All depression spectrum personality disorders are melancholic and can be looked at in terms of these subtypes.

DSM-5

Similarities to dysthymic disorder
Much of the controversy surrounding the potential inclusion of depressive personality disorder in the DSM-5 stems from its apparent similarities to dysthymic disorder, a diagnosis already included in the DSM-IV. Dysthymic disorder is characterized by a variety of depressive symptoms, such as hypersomnia or fatigue, low self-esteem, poor appetite, or difficulty making decisions, for over two years, with symptoms never numerous or severe enough to qualify as major depressive disorder. Patients with dysthymic disorder may experience social withdrawal, pessimism, and feelings of inadequacy at higher rates than other depression spectrum patients. Early-onset dysthymia is the diagnosis most closely related to depressive personality disorder.

The key difference between dysthymic disorder and depressive personality disorder is the focus of the symptoms used to diagnose. Dysthymic disorder is diagnosed by looking at the somatic senses, the more tangible senses. Depressive personality disorder is diagnosed by looking at the cognitive and intrapsychic symptoms. The symptoms of dysthymic disorder and depressive personality disorder may look similar at first glance, but the way these symptoms are considered distinguish the two diagnoses.

Comorbidity with other disorders
Many researchers believe that depressive personality disorder is so highly comorbid with other depressive disorders, manic-depressive episodes and dysthymic disorder, that it is redundant to include it as a distinct diagnosis. Recent studies however, have found that dysthymic disorder and depressive personality disorder are not as comorbid as previously thought. It was found that almost two thirds of the test subjects with depressive personality disorder did not have dysthymic disorder, and 83% did not have early-onset dysthymia.

The comorbidity with Axis I depressive disorders is not as high as had been assumed. An experiment conducted by American psychologists showed that depressive personality disorder shows a high comorbidity rate with major depression experienced at some point in a lifetime and with any mood disorders experienced at any point in a lifetime. A high comorbidity rate with these disorders is expected of many diagnoses. As for the extremely high comorbidity rate with mood disorders, it has been found that essentially all mood disorders are comorbid with at least one other, especially when looking at a lifetime sample size.

References

Further reading
 Finnerty, Todd (2009). Depressive Personality Disorder: Understanding Current Trends in Research and Practice. Columbus, OH: WorldWideMentalHealth.com.
 Huprich, Steven K. (2009). What Should Become of Depressive Personality Disorder in DSM-V? Harvard Review of Psychiatry, 17:1,41-59.
 Millon, Theodore; Davis; Roger; Millon, Carrie (1997). MCMI-III Manual, 2nd edition. Minneapolis, MN: National Computer Systems.

Personality disorders
Mood disorders